Shuruiyeh-ye Olya (also Romanized as Shūrū’īyeh-ye ‘Olyā; also known as Shuru and Shūrū’īyeh) is a village in Pariz Rural District, Pariz District, Sirjan County, Kerman Province, Iran. According to the 2006 census, its population was 19, in 7 families.

References 

Populated places in Sirjan County